Geoffrey Vivian Myburgh (30 December 1928 – 2 March 2010) was a South African Olympic sailor and one of the founders of the NSRI of which he became financial director, chairman and life governor.

Career
When Myburgh was a child, he always had a love of the sea, and started his sailing career from Kalk Bay on Spindrift, designed by Norman Ross of the RCYC. In 1951, he began sailing at ZVYC crewing with Joyce, Bongers and Burnwood. He sailed for RCYC on Sea Swallow, and competed 30 square metres in the event, in the Lipton Cup Challenge in 1952. He represented South Africa at the 1956 Olympic games in Melbourne and the FD worlds in 1958. He later competed in his Finn in Sweden and Finland. He helped with the construction of the first 20 Optimists at ZVYC in 1971, and introduced the Laser into the country in 1973 and sailed many world championships winning several master's trophies in the class. He later received the SA Sports Merit Award as a coach in 1977. He became an ISAF international judge in 1982, a status he continued throughout the rest of his life, and travelled the world in this regard. He was involved in the administration of various classes and was principal race officer and chairman of the organising committees for many major events, including Cork Week.

Death
On 2 March 2010, Myburgh died at the age of 81. He was survived by his wife Helen, three children, and five grandchildren.

References

 Geoff Myburgh's obituary at SA Sailing
 Geoff Myburgh's obituary at the International Laser Class Association
 Geoff Myburgh's obituary at the Royal Cork Yacht Club
 Geoff Myburgh's obituary at the International Sailing Federation
 

1928 births
2010 deaths
South African male sailors (sport)
Sailors at the 1956 Summer Olympics – 5.5 Metre
Olympic sailors of South Africa